John Rouse (Rous, Russe) (1574 – 3 April 1652) was an English librarian, second librarian of the Bodleian in Oxford, and a friend of John Milton.

Life

He was born in Somerset, matriculated at Oxford in 1591, and graduated B.A. from Balliol College on 31 January 1599. He was elected Fellow of Oriel College in 1600, and received his M.A. 27 March 1604.

On 9 May 1620 he was chosen chief librarian of the Bodleian Library, a post he discharged with great vigour and acumen until his death. At that time he occupied 'Cambye's lodgings', also written 'Camby's', once a part of St. Frideswide's Priory as a medieval tenement. He afterwards sold the property to Pembroke College, as a residence for the master.

Rouse annotated a collection of Robert Burton's books which were given to the Bodleian Library by testamentary disposition on Burton's death, and two of his inscriptions are cited by Alan H.Nelson as supplying independent confirmation that, for this learned bibliographer, William Shakespeare was identified by a contemporary as the author of Burton's copies of two of Shakespeare's narrative poems. The inscriptions read.
 Venus and Adonis by Wm Shakespear Lond. 1602
 The rape of Lucrece by Wm Shakespear Imp{er}fet.

About 1635 Rouse formed a friendship with Milton; Barbara Lewalski considers they met in Horton, where Milton was studying. He asked the poet for a complete copy of his works for the library, and Milton in 1647 sent two volumes to Oxford, the prose pamphlets carefully inscribed in his own hand 'to the most excellent judge of books,' and a smaller volume of poems which was stolen or lost on the way. To this circumstance we owe Milton's mock-heroic ode To John Rouse (dated 23 January 1646-7) inserted in a second copy, preserved at the Bodleian.

In 1645 he refused to lend King Charles the 'Histoire Universelle du Sieur d'Aubigné' because the statutes forbade the removal of such a book. Christopher Arnold, professor of history at Nuremberg, and Lambecius both complimented him. He died on 3 April 1652, and was buried in Oriel College Chapel. Rouse wrote a dedicatory preface to a collection of verses addressed to the Danish proconsul, Johan Cirenberg (Oxford, 1631). He also issued an appendix to the Bodleian Catalogue in 1635. His portrait hangs in the Middle Common Room of Oriel College.

Notes

References

1574 births
1652 deaths
English librarians
Bodley's Librarians
16th-century English educators
17th-century English people
Alumni of Balliol College, Oxford
Fellows of Oriel College, Oxford
People from Northamptonshire
Burials in Oxfordshire